The Breeze Basingstoke & North Hampshire was an independent local radio station serving  Basingstoke and the surrounding area of North Hampshire. Owned and operated by Bauer as part of the Greatest Hits Radio Network.

History

Kestrel FM
The Basingstoke station launched on 18 May 1998, and is now owned by Celador. The previous owners Milestone launched a free weekly local newspaper, the Basingstoke Observer, in association with Kestrel FM in 2000.

In 2010, 107.6 Kestrel FM in Basingstoke was merged with Delta FM in Alton, Bordon, Haslemere and Petersfield. However, initially the old Delta FM frequencies had a separate Breakfast Show, hosted by Dave Trumper. Outside of weekday Breakfast the former Delta Radio frequencies shared with Kestrel FM 107.6.

By 2011, even this practice seemed to have been discontinued, with all areas receiving programming from Basingstoke.

Celador takeover
Up until 2012, Kestrel FM was run by the Tindle Radio Group. The station was latterly taken over by Celador and on 16 December 2012, rebranded as The Breeze.

The station continues to broadcast programming from its Basingstoke studios, from where regional programming for the Thames Valley and local news bulletins originate. The East Hampshire frequencies were moved to the Southampton-based Breeze station and 107.6 to the Thames Valley station.

Closure
The Breeze was purchased by Bauer Media in 2019 along with many other radio stations. On 27 May 2020 it was announced that The Breeze will become Greatest Hits Radio from early September 2020.  The station went through a transitional period where it's playlist was changed over to the 70s, 80s and 90s era and jingles changed to reflect the station playing "greatest hits".   The Breeze was finally rebranded to Greatest Hits Radio South at 6:00am on 1 September 2020.

See also
Bauer Radio
The Breeze (radio network)

References

External links
 

Basingstoke
Radio stations in Hampshire
Radio stations established in 1998